Sir Francis James Grant  (1863–1953) was a Scottish officer of arms who eventually rose to the office of Lord Lyon King of Arms. Grant served in the Court of the Lord Lyon as Carrick Pursuivant of Arms in Ordinary beginning on 17 May 1886. This appointment lasted until his promotion to the office of Rothesay Herald of Arms in Ordinary and Lyon Clerk and Keeper of the Records on 8 September 1898. 

On 10 May 1929, he was appointed Lord Lyon King of Arms and Secretary of the Order of the Thistle. He was made a Knight Commander of the Royal Victorian Order in 1935. Grant retired from the office on 30 June 1945. He was the representative of Grant of Corrimony, and was the son of John Grant, Marchmont Herald of Arms in Ordinary from 1884 to 1888.

He was elected a Fellow of the American Society of Genealogists in 1944.

Arms

See also
King of Arms
Heraldry
Pursuivant
Herald

References

External links
Court of the Lord Lyon
The Heraldry Society of Scotland

1863 births
Knights Commander of the Royal Victorian Order
Scottish genealogists
Lord Lyon Kings of Arms
Fellows of the American Society of Genealogists
1953 deaths